The 1985–86 Major Indoor Soccer League season was the eighth in league history and ended with the San Diego Sockers winning their third MISL title in four seasons over the Minnesota Strikers. It was the Sockers' fifth straight indoor title, as they had also won the North American Soccer League's indoor league in 1982 and 1984.

Recap
For the most part, the league format remained unchanged. A 48-game season would be followed with an eight-team playoff, similar to the playoff system used from 1982 to 1984. There would be one major change in gameplay, however. The shootout, part of the MISL since its inception, was dropped in favor of multiple overtime periods to decide games, if necessary. There was a steady national TV contract for the first time since 1983, as ESPN would televise 15 regular-season games and assorted playoff games.

The East and West division races were a study in contrasts. San Diego ran away with the West again, despite selling reigning league MVP Steve Zungul to the Tacoma Stars for $200,000 halfway through the regular season. Tacoma would go 11-8 with Zungul, who won the league scoring title for the sixth time in the MISL's eight years. However, the Stars lost in four games to the Sockers in the league semifinals.

In the East, the six-team division was separated by only four games. The playoff positions were only confirmed when the Baltimore Blast defeated the Pittsburgh Spirit in the season finale. The Dallas Sidekicks switched divisions and promptly won 13 more games than the previous year, making the playoffs for the first time and earning Gordon Jago Coach of the Year honors.

For the second straight year, the Strikers and Sockers went to a deciding game in their playoff matchup. San Diego became the first team to rally from a two-game deficit to win a MISL playoff series, as the Strikers' 3-1 lead in the championship series disappeared under three straight Socker wins. In the first seventh game in MISL history, the Sockers held off a late Minnesota charge to win 5-3. San Diego's Brian Quinn scored two goals and an assist on his way to playoff MVP honors.

After the season, the Spirit folded, and the league made plans to return to New York with an expansion franchise.

Teams

Regular season schedule

The 1985–86 regular season schedule ran from October 25, 1985, to April 6, 1986. Despite the loss of two teams from the 1984-85 lineup, the schedule remained at 48 games.

Final standings

Playoff teams in bold.

Playoffs

Quarterfinals

Semifinals

Championship Series

Regular season player statistics

Scoring leaders

GP = Games Played, G = Goals, A = Assists, Pts = Points

Leading goalkeepers

Note: GP = Games played; Min – Minutes played; GA = Goals against; GAA = Goals against average; W = Wins; L = Losses

Playoff player statistics

Scoring leaders

GP = Games Played, G = Goals, A = Assists, Pts = Points

Leading goalkeepers

Note: GP = Games played; Min – Minutes played; GA = Goals against; GAA = Goals against average; W = Wins; L = Losses

All-MISL teams

League awards
 Most Valuable Player: Steve Zungul, San Diego/Tacoma
 Scoring Champion: Steve Zungul, San Diego/Tacoma
 Pass Master: Steve Zungul, San Diego/Tacoma
 Defender of the Year: Kim Roentved, Wichita
 Rookie of the Year: Dave Boncek, Kansas City Comets
 Goalkeeper of the Year: Keith Van Eron, Baltimore
 Coach of the Year: Gordon Jago, Dallas
 Championship Series Most Valuable Player: Brian Quinn, San Diego

Team attendance totals

References

External links
 The Year in American Soccer – 1986
 1986 page – Dallas Sidekicks Memorial Archive
 1985-86 summary at The MISL: A Look Back

Major Indoor Soccer League (1978–1992) seasons
1986 in American soccer leagues
1985 in American soccer leagues